is a town located in Akita, Japan. , the town had an estimated population of 6,466 in 2981 households, and a population density of 28 persons per km2.

Geography
Happō is located in the mountainous far northwestern corner of Akita Prefecture, bordered by the World Heritage Site Shirakami Mountains to the south, and by Aomori Prefecture to the north and the Sea of Japan to the west. Approximately 80% of the area is classified as mountainous or forest, and about 10% of the total area is agricultural land, most of which is in the Minehama area. Due to its location, the temperature in Happō can get remarkably cold at night, with snowfall tending to be somewhat greater than that in neighboring municipalities

Neighboring municipalities
Akita Prefecture
Noshiro
Fujisato
Aomori Prefecture
Ajigasawa
Fukaura

Climate
Happō has a Humid subtropical climate (Köppen climate classification Cfa) with large seasonal temperature differences, with warm to hot (and often humid) summers and cold (sometimes severely cold) winters. Precipitation is significant throughout the year, but is heaviest from August to October.

Demographics
Per Japanese census data, the population of Happō has been in steady decline for the past 60 years.

History
The area of present-day Happō was part of ancient Dewa Province, dominated by the Satake clan during the Edo period, who ruled Kubota Domain under the Tokugawa shogunate. The village of Hachimori was established with the creation of the modern municipalities system on April1, 1889. It was raised to town status on October 1, 1954. The town of Happō was created on March 27, 2006, by merger of Hachimori with the village of Minehama, both from Yamamoto District.

Government
Happō has a mayor-council form of government with a directly elected mayor and a unicameral town council of 12 members. Happō, together with the city of Noshiro and the other municipalities of Yamamoto District contributes four members to the Akita Prefectural Assembly. In terms of national politics, the town is part of Akita 2nd district of the lower house of the Diet of Japan.

Economy
The economy of Happō is based on agriculture and commercial fishing.

Education
Happō has two public elementary schools and one middle school operated by the town government. The town does not have a high school.

Transportation

Railway
 East Japan Railway Company -  Gonō Line
  –  –  –  –  –

Highway

Sister city relations
 – Guangling District, Jiangsu

References

External links

Official Website 

 
Towns in Akita Prefecture
Populated coastal places in Japan